Madame Bovary is a 2014 historical romantic drama film directed by Sophie Barthes, based on the 1856 novel of the same name by French author Gustave Flaubert. The film stars Mia Wasikowska, Rhys Ifans, Ezra Miller, Logan Marshall-Green, Henry Lloyd-Hughes, Laura Carmichael, Olivier Gourmet, and Paul Giamatti.

Plot
Emma, a young woman who is not yet 18 years old, packs up her belongings and prepares to leave the convent to marry the man her farmer father has arranged as her husband: country doctor Charles Bovary. However, she becomes bored and miserable in the small, provincial town of Yonville. She spends most of her time alone, reading or wandering in the garden while Charles tends to patients. Even when he is home, Emma feels bored or neglected by Charles.

Emma longs for more — excitement, passion, status, and love. She shows restraint at first, when smitten law clerk Leon Dupuis skittishly professes his affections for her. However, she is intrigued by the dashing Marquis, who makes more overt advances. Their affair emboldens her as she believes it gives her a glimpse of the good life. She spends money she does not have on lavish dresses and decorations from the obsequious dry-goods dealer Monsieur Lheureux, who is all too happy to continue extending her credit.

Cast
 Mia Wasikowska as Emma Bovary
 Henry Lloyd-Hughes as Charles Bovary
 Ezra Miller as Leon Dupuis, one of Emma's lovers
 Paul Giamatti as Monsieur Homais, the local pharmacist
 Rhys Ifans as Monsieur Lheureux
 Logan Marshall-Green as the Marquis or Rodolphe Boulanger in the novel
 Olivier Gourmet as Monsieur Rouault
 Laura Carmichael as Henriette

Production
In March 2012, it was reported that Mia Wasikowska had been cast in a film to be directed by Sophie Barthes. Ezra Miller joined the cast in May and Rhys Ifans in October 2012. Laura Carmichael, Olivier Gourmet, and Logan Marshall-Green were linked to the project in September 2013. Filming began on 30 September 2013 in Normandy.

Joe Neurauter and Felipe Marino of Occupant Entertainment produced the film in association with director Sophie Barthes' production company Aden Films and Jaime Mateus-Tique from Aleph Motion Pictures.

Warner Bros. secured all German-speaking rights to the film from A Company Filmed Entertainment in April 2014.

On September 9, 2014, one day before its Telluride Film Festival debut, Millennium Entertainment acquired the U.S. distribution rights to the film.

Reception
Madame Bovary received mixed reviews. On Rotten Tomatoes, the film holds a 43% score based on 68 reviews, with an average rating of 5.68/10. The film's consensus reads: "Over the years, Flaubert's Madame Bovary has proven an exceedingly difficult novel to film - and this version adds another disappointing entry to the list." The film holds a score of 52 out of 100 on Metacritic, based on reviews from 19 critics, indicating 'mixed or average reviews'.

References

External links
 
 Madame Bovary plot at Rogerebert
 

2014 films
2010s historical drama films
2010s historical romance films
2014 romantic drama films
American historical drama films
American historical romance films
American romantic drama films
Belgian historical drama films
Belgian romantic drama films
English-language Belgian films
English-language German films
Films about infidelity
Films based on Madame Bovary
Films set in the 19th century
Films shot in France
German historical drama films
German historical romance films
German romantic drama films
Films set in France
2010s English-language films
2010s American films
2010s German films